Operation Brother Sam was the use of the United States Navy and Air Force in support of the coup in Brazil in 1964. With the deterioration in relations with João Goulart's government and the favorable attitude of the groups conspiring against him, the idea of an operation to ensure the success of an uprising arose. The issue was discussed between the U.S. ambassador to Brazil, Lincoln Gordon, and officials in Washington throughout the administration of president John F. Kennedy and his successor Lyndon B. Johnson. They thought about logistical support, the positioning of a squadron on the Brazilian coast to "show the flag" and even, in an extreme situation, a plan for a gigantic land operation, which was not used. The operation was planned by maintaining contact with Brazilian conspirators such as general Castelo Branco, and had as an assumption the formation of a provisional government that would request foreign aid. 

With the outbreak of the coup d'état, the operation was activated to transfer fuel such as gasoline by sea to the insurgent military, to leave a squadron near Brazil, and to take war supplies by air. The naval component consisted of the aircraft carrier USS Forrestal, a helicopter carrier and six destroyers from the Second Fleet, as well as four tankers. The aircraft carrier departed from Virginia, while the tankers were to load in the Caribbean. The air component was seven C-135 aircraft, eight supply aircraft, one air support and rescue aircraft, eight fighters, a communications plane, an airborne command post, weapons and ammunition. Air Force general George S. Brown was given command of the mission, which was coordinated by the Southern Command in Panama.

While shipments waited at the air bases, ships began to leave their ports. However, the opposition military in Brazil quickly overthrew the Goulart government, and Castelo Branco reported that logistical support would not be needed. The operation was thus deactivated before it had any physical effect in Brazil, but it demonstrated the interventionist disposition of the American government. It came to light between 1976 and 1977 with the declassification of documents.

Context 

After the Cuban Revolution in 1959, the U.S. government's attitude toward leftist leaders in Latin America hardened. Among them was the government of João Goulart in Brazil. Jango, as he was known, worried the United States with his domestic and foreign policies, and bilateral relations deteriorated. The Alliance for Progress, which would be a moderate way to influence him, did not achieve its objectives, and Washington started to weaken the Brazilian government with measures such as financing the opposition's electoral campaigns in 1962 and redirecting economic assistance to opposition governors.

After a certain period, disputed in the literature, Washington became favorable to the ousting of Goulart. Since 1961 some groups of Brazilian military were conspiring against the government, and the U.S. Embassy was aware of these movements. In 1963, the U.S. government was already looking for a group in the Brazilian Armed Forces capable of overthrowing Goulart. Meanwhile, by the end of that year they were developing contingency plans and working on what to do in case of a rebellion. The concern arose that they would need American support to succeed; On October 7, Kennedy asked Gordon about the possibility that intervention might be necessary. A State Department document made in November mentioned a new contingency plan with "heavy emphasis on armed U.S. intervention." Brother Sam was born out of a contingency plan, which, however, was broader in scope.

Developing the operation

American Summit discussions 
The December 11, 1963 version of the contingency plan, probably in development since the previous months, listed four possibilities. The third, the removal of Goulart, was similar to what actually happened. The second was:

The military conspirators were called "democratic forces". At the summit's request,

The paper stressed that its premature discovery would be politically damaging. Likewise, an open intervention followed by Goulart's victory against his opponents would be an embarrassment. The idea of a naval task force was not present at the beginning, but there was room for it in the possibility of "intervening with force only if there was Soviet or Cuban intervention," which could allude even to a ground operation.

By mid-March 1964, the Embassy could see the worsening of the political crisis, the union of the military conspirators in the figure of general Castelo Branco, who could lead a coup d'état, and the adhesion of the State governors to the conspiracy. A meeting at the White House on March 20 and another at the Embassy shortly thereafter established sending an aircraft carrier and tankers to support the opposition. The former had the assumption that, even with Castelo Branco's supporters taking most of the country, there might be resistance in Rio Grande do Sul and Pernambuco, and a naval presence on the coast would be a show of force in favor of the rebels, "showing the flag". Lincoln Gordon later stated that one of the goals of the task force would be to evacuate American citizens on Brazilian territory. This is possible, but it is not mentioned in his correspondence with the Secretary of State in 1964.

The idea was criticized by some experts at a meeting at the White House. For McGeorge Bundy, National Security Advisor, "the punishment doesn't seem to match the crime." General Andrew Goodpaster did not understand how the squad could help the oppositionists. Lincoln Gordon had to face opposition from his superiors to get his ideas across, standing out as the central figure in all the support to the Brazilian military conspirators.

The fuel supply would prevent Goulart supporters in Petrobras from cutting off supply. This concern had been transmitted to the Central Intelligence Agency (CIA) by the São Paulo businessman Alberto Byington. On the other hand, the December 1963 plan already mentioned fuel and stated that its provisions should be guaranteed, evidencing that the idea was not born at the last minute. In addition to fuel, there was concern about armaments. Gordon had already registered on Brazil's internal defense plan, of March 20, the poverty of equipment of the Brazilian security forces.

Provisional government and state of belligerency 

The December 1963 contingency plan set a condition for logistical support: 

Similarly, at the time of the coup the State Department specified that fuel and ammunition supplies could come only after "the point at which some group having a reasonable claim to legitimacy is able to formally request recognition and assistance from us and if possible from other American republics." The situation of insurgency or belligerency would regularize the opposition on a legal level. The constitution of this new government, however, would depend on it, suggesting the contact of Brazilian conspirators with the American plans. The link between this idea and the Brazilian conspiracy was senator .

Magalhães Pinto, governor of Minas Gerais, threw his state into rebellion in conjunction with the local Army garrison at the beginning of the coup d'état. The day before, he named a supra-partisan secretariat "of hermetic union", including a Secretariat without Portfolio reserved for Afonso Arinos. Once called to Belo Horizonte on the 31st, his function would be that of "chancellor of the revolution", "the first chancellor of the Republic outside Itamaraty", in charge of getting the belligerence recognized abroad. According to him, Magalhães first extended this invitation in November 1963, when he mentioned the possibility of a prolonged resistance from Minas Gerais; his actions would allow, for example, the purchase of weapons abroad. According to him,

It obtained the consent of the governor of Espírito Santo and defined that the Military Police of Minas Gerais would defend this logistical corridor. At the time of the rebellion, it organized the "East Detachment" near Rio de Janeiro and Espírito Santo's borders, with the 6th and 11th Infantry Battalions. Still, a rebellion could be crushed early on, as foreign supplies would take days to arrive. In the case of a civil war, Minas Gerais would be at a disadvantage even if it could get arms for 50,000 volunteers. The CIA reported that the Port of Vitória would be needed to receive fuel, and the rebels could control it.

Gordon even sent a message to several governors about the need for the formation of a government with legitimacy. The CIA reported that in the event of open conflict in Brazil, Argentina would request OAS intervention in Brazil.

Afonso Arinos was relevant during the coup when he informed congressman San Tiago Dantas of his planned involvement. On the morning of April 1, Dantas told Goulart that the US State Department would be willing to recognize a parallel government of the rebels. This was one of the reasons for the president's departure from Rio de Janeiro.

The hypothesis of a landing 

In his conversation with Kennedy in October 1963, Lincoln Gordon mentioned that: 

Such an operation would far exceed the scale of the presence in Vietnam, where there were 16,300 American troops at the end of 1963. It is comparable to the "Pot of Gold" plan of 1940 to land 100,000 men in Brazil. This plan has not yet been declassified. There is a difference of opinion about being part of or distinct from Brother Sam.. The contingency plan vaguely alluded to the possibility in case of external communist interference. The aircraft operation unleashed during the coup, however, did not include troop landings. On March 30, Secretary of State Dean Rusk noted that "in a country of over 75 million people, larger than continental United States, this is not a job for a handful of United States Marines."

In this case it would be necessary to consult the American Congress and the Organization of American States, a "really shocking scenario".  noted that the ships were not carrying land contingents, and the growing involvement in Vietnam would make a second front in Brazil difficult. Moniz Bandeira emphasized the possibility of an invasion. Elio Gaspari wrote that "there is no documented record that foresaw an immediate troop disembarkation".

Final days 

The operation was planned in cooperation with Brazilians, with general José Pinheiro de Ulhoa Cintra as an intermediary. On March 28, Gordon recorded how logistical concerns were coming from the conspirators and would be specified the following week through contact between general Cintra and military attaché Vernon Walters. In Marco Antonio Villa's interpretation, the operation could have in mind the Castelista coup scheduled for the first half of April, which would allow the ships to be already close to Brazil at the moment of deflagration. On the 27th, a Lincoln Gordon memo predicted the climax of the political crisis in a few days, with Castelo Branco as the leader of the "revolution." 

CIA reports in Minas Gerais on the 30th recorded the imminent beginning of the movement. In the early morning hours of the 31st, general Olímpio Mourão Filho, commander of the Brazilian Army in Minas Gerais, precipitated the coup d'état, over the heads of Castelo Branco and the other conspirators in Rio de Janeiro and São Paulo.

The task force in action

Beginning 
At 11:30 AM, a high-level meeting in Washington discussed air and naval support capabilities. In a telegram sent to the Embassy, they defined the dilemma between "not letting an opportunity pass that may not be repeated" and "not putting the U.S. government in charge of a lost cause." In addition to the squadron and fuel supplies proposed by the Embassy, the shipment of arms and ammunition was also approved. At 1:50 PM Rear Admiral John L. Chew ordered the task force with the aircraft carrier USS Forrestal and two guided-missile destroyers to be sent to the vicinity of Santos, where it could receive further orders. In parallel, a helicopter support group would also be sent, embarked on a ship accompanied by four destroyers. These ships belonged to the Second Fleet in the 4th Aircraft Carrier Division and 162nd and 262nd Destroyer Divisions. The Forrestal task force was to depart Norfolk, Virginia, at 07:00 on the 1st, local time (09:00 in Rio de Janeiro). The ships would take a few days to assemble. The task force with the aircraft carrier was expected in the area about April 10 or 11th, and the helicopters, in the 14th.

Under secrecy, tankers would be loaded in Aruba starting at 19:00 (Rio de Janeiro time) on the 31st and then sent in the direction of Brazil. The cargo of common gasoline would be the equivalent of one day's consumption in Brazil at 1977 levels. On the morning of the 2nd, one of them, the Santa Ynez, was ready to leave. It was bound for Montevideo, Uruguay, but on April 10 or 11 it would be near Rio de Janeiro. There was the alternative of transporting fuel by air.

For airlift, 250 .12 caliber shotguns would be transferred to Ramey Air Force Base in Puerto Rico at 03:00 (Rio de Janeiro time) on the 1st. Meanwhile, by noon (US Eastern time) 110 tons of handguns and ammunition would arrive at McGuire Air Force Base in New Jersey. The air force would consist of approximately seven C-135 (six for transport and one for support), eight escort fighters, up to eight supply aircraft, one air relief support, one communications, and one airborne command post. Tear gas would also be transported for crowd control. In the telegram from the State Department to the Embassy on March 31, the forecast was that, if conditions for shipment existed, it would take 24 to 36 hours and would be destined for Campinas. Another telegram predicted a landing in Recife.

Air Force general George S. Brown was designated the mission commander, while general Breitweiser, head of air forces in the Southern Command, has gone on to command the Southern Command's Joint Task Force. Starting at 07:00 (09:00 Rio time), this task force, with officers from the United States Army, Navy, Air Force, and CIA met at the Air Force Base in Panama to coordinate the logistics of the operation.

Cancellation 

On the 1st, senior officials in Washington, concerned about the possibility of open support for the rebellion benefiting Jango, asked the Embassy whether "the momentum would continue on the anti-Goulart side without covert or overt encouragement from us." Lincoln Gordon replied that "the momentum clearly picked up" and open support would be political error. He added that Ademar de Barros, governor of São Paulo, and other people from São Paulo had requested fuel and an overt naval presence, but they were not important. The Americans were well informed of the course of events in Brazil and in contact with Castelo Branco. The latter told Gordon that he did not need logistical support, and from then on the operation began to be dismantled. At 5:30 pm, the ambassador reported from the "95% victorious democratic rebellion".

In a report sent at 01:00 in the morning on the 2nd, Gordon clarified that fuel and armaments might still be needed, since control over the refineries was not yet guaranteed and there was still resistance in the Third Army. At 16:00, Castelo Branco confirmed that the last military resistance in the Third Army was over. The order to disband the Joint Task Force came at 17:22, going into effect at 20:00. At 16:30 (Rio time) on the 3rd, it was determined that "the current situation in Brazil will not require the presence of the Task Force with aircraft carriers in ocean waters to the south of the country", as suggested by Gordon in the middle of the previous day.

The operation became the "Quick Kick" training, after which the ships returned to business as usual. Forrestal's log records how the carrier left Hampton Roads on April 1, headed 17º N 60º W and came back, anchoring again on the 8th. On the 3rd, Dean Rusk informed Gordon that with the military deactivation, costs of $2.3 million for the tankers would not be covered by the budget and might have to be reimbursed by Brazil, which did not occur. In the afternoon general O'Meara dismissed the air commands, keeping only the fuel movement. In the evening, the Joint Chiefs of Staff cancelled air and oil transports. Tankers continued moving until April 4 or 5, while weapons and ammunition remained at bases until April 7.

Discovery 
After the coup, some evidence of an American military operation emerged. Brazillinist Thomas Skidmore mentioned in an article at the time that Brazilian conspirators requested material support from American diplomats. Four years later, during an interview by Carlos Lacerda on the television program Firing Line, a sailor in the audience stated that at the time his ship was ordered to follow to Brazil. Some conspirators also made mention of it, such as Mourão Filho, who admitted knowing about the possible approach of a squadron. However, Lincoln Gordon and Vernon Walters denied that there was more than veiled monitoring of events.

In the words of Elio Gaspari, "the American fleet was only sighted twelve years later". The operation came to light through historian Phyllis R. Parker. As part of her master's program, begun in 1974, she accessed newly released documents at the Lyndon B. Johnson Library. With Gordon's own help interpreting the documents, she found events missing from the history books of Skidmore and John W. F. Dulles and in contradiction with the official version of American officials. Journalist  also examined the documents and published articles in Jornal do Brasil, which were later included in the book 1964 visto e comentado pela Casa Branca ("1964 seen and commented by the White House").

See also 
Operation Condor
Operation Farroupilha
United States involvement in regime change
United States involvement in regime change in Latin America

Notes

References

Sources

Books
 
 
 
 
 
 
 
 
 
 

Articles and works
 
 
 
 
 
 

Newspapers, magazines and websites
 

Documents
 
 
 
 
 
 
 
 
 

1964 in Brazil
1964 in the United States
Brazil–United States military relations
Military operations involving the United States